This is the discography of German singer Lou Bega.

Albums

Studio albums

Compilation albums
 2002: King of Mambo
 2004: Mambo Mambo - The Best of Lou Bega
 2013: Beautiful World - A Little Collection of Lou Bega's Best
 2016: Best of - Seine größten Hits

Singles

Promotional singles

Music videos

Music video appearances

References

External links
 Official website
 Lou Bega at AllMusic
 
 

Discographies of German artists
Pop music discographies